Humble may refer to:

 Humility, the quality of being humble

Places 
 Humble, Denmark
 Humble, Kentucky, US
 Humble, Texas, US
 Humble Civic Center Arena
 Humble High School
 Humble Island, Antarctica

People 
 Humble (surname)
 Humble Howard, Howard Glassman, one half of the Toronto morning radio show duo Humble & Fred
 Humblus, or Humble, a legendary Danish king

Music
 "Humble" (song), by Kendrick Lamar, 2017
 "Humble", a 2020 song by Lil Baby from My Turn
 "Humble", a 2012 song by Soluna Samay

Other uses 
 Humble (production studio), an American film and video production company
 Humble baronets, two titles in the Baronetage of England, one in the Baronetage of the United Kingdom, all extinct
 Humble Building, now the ExxonMobil Building, a skyscraper in Houston, Texas, US

See also